Gibbet Mill may refer to a number of windmills:

Gibbet Mill, Rye, East Sussex
Gibbet Mill, Great Saughall, a windmill in Great Saughall, Cheshire, UK

See also
 Gibbet Hill (disambiguation)